In number theory, a Fermi–Dirac prime is a prime power whose exponent is a power of two. These numbers are named from an analogy to Fermi–Dirac statistics in physics based on the fact that each integer has a unique representation as a product of Fermi–Dirac primes without repetition. Each element of the sequence of Fermi–Dirac primes is the smallest number that does not divide the product of all previous elements. Srinivasa Ramanujan used the Fermi–Dirac primes to find the smallest number whose number of divisors is a given power of two.

Definition
The Fermi–Dirac primes are a sequence of numbers obtained by raising a prime number to an exponent that is a power of two. These numbers form the sequence: 

They can be obtained from the prime numbers by repeated squaring, and form the smallest set of numbers that includes all of the prime numbers and is closed under squaring.

Another way of defining this sequence is that each element is the smallest positive integer that does not divide the product of all of the previous elements of the sequence.

Factorization
Analogously to the way that every positive integer has a unique factorization, its representation as a product of prime numbers (with some of these numbers repeated), every positive integer also has a unique factorization as a product of Fermi–Dirac primes, with no repetitions allowed. For example, 

The Fermi–Dirac primes are named from an analogy to particle physics. In physics, bosons are particles that obey Bose–Einstein statistics, in which it is allowed for multiple particles to be in the same state at the same time. Fermions are particles that obey Fermi–Dirac statistics, which only allow a single particle in each state. Similarly, for the usual prime numbers, multiple copies of the same prime number can appear in the same prime factorization, but factorizations into a product of Fermi–Dirac primes only allow each Fermi–Dirac prime to appear once within the product.

Other properties
The Fermi–Dirac primes can be used to find the smallest number that has exactly  divisors, in the case that  is a power of two, . In this case, as Srinivasa Ramanujan proved, the smallest number with  divisors is the product of the  smallest Fermi–Dirac primes. Its divisors are the numbers obtained by multiplying together any subset of these  Fermi–Dirac primes. For instance, the smallest number with 1024 divisors is obtained by multiplying together the first ten Fermi–Dirac primes:

In the theory of infinitary divisors of Cohen, the Fermi–Dirac primes are exactly the numbers whose only infinitary divisors are 1 and the number itself.

References

Prime numbers
Integer sequences